Władysław Jędrzejewski (11 February 1863 - 1940) was a General of the Polish Army, who was probably murdered by the NKVD in Lwów, in March 1940. He fought in several conflicts, including World War I and the Invasion of Poland.

Jędrzejewski was born on 11 February 1863 in his family’s real estate Nowiny, located near Lepiel, Russian Empire (current Belarus). In 1884, after graduation from a Cadet School in Polotsk, he joined the 93rd Irkutsk Infantry Regiment of the Imperial Russian Army. As a professional Russian soldier, he fought in the Russo-Japanese War and World War I. In 1916, Jedrzejewski was promoted to major general.

In December 1918 in Warsaw, he joined the newly created Polish Army. In March 1919, Jędrzejewski was transferred to Lwów, where he commanded the defence of the city in the Polish-Ukrainian War. In August 1919, he became commandant of the 5th Lwow Infantry Division, and on 21 April 1920 was promoted to colonel general. In May - August 1920, during the Polish–Soviet War, Jędrzejewski commanded the Polish First Army. In August - September 1920, he commanded the Polish Sixth Army, and then the Sixth Army Operational Group.

In September 1921, Jędrzejewski was transferred back to Lwów, becoming commandant of the Sixth Military District. On 3 March 1922 he was promoted to generał dywizji, and on 30 June 1924 was retired. Jędrzejewski settled in Lwów, and was named manager of the Association of Care of Heroes' Graves.

During the 1939 Invasion of Poland, Jędrzejewski, at age 76, volunteered to the army, and formed the Citizens Guard in Lwów. On 4 October 1939 he was arrested by the NKVD, and was shot either in late 1939 or in March 1940 (at the latter date he was aged 77). In 2012, he was reburied at the Polish Military Cemetery in Kiev. His son, Captain Tadeusz Jędrzejewski, was killed in action during the Siege of Warsaw (1939).

Awards 
 Silver Cross of the Virtuti Militari (1921), 
 Commander Cross of the Polonia Restituta (2 May 1923) 
 Cross of Valour (Poland) (four times), 
 Grand Cross of the Order of the Crown (Romania), 
 Commander of the Legion of Honour.

Sources 
 Piotr Stawecki, Słownik biograficzny generałów Wojska Polskiego 1918-1939, Warszawa 1994
 Henryk P. Kosk, Generalicja polska, t. 1 (A-Ł), Pruszków 1998

1863 births
1940 deaths
People from Lepiel District
People from the Russian Empire of Polish descent
Polish people of World War I
Russian military personnel of the Russo-Japanese War
Russian military personnel of World War I
Katyn massacre victims
Polish people of the Polish–Ukrainian War
Polish people of the Polish–Soviet War
Polish people executed by the Soviet Union
Polish people who died in Soviet detention
Polish people who died in prison custody
Polish prisoners and detainees
Polish prisoners of war
World War II prisoners of war held by the Soviet Union
Recipients of the Cross of Valour (Poland)
Recipients of the Order of Polonia Restituta
Recipients of the Virtuti Militari
Recipients of the Order of the Crown (Romania)
Grand Crosses of the Order of the Crown (Romania)
Recipients of the Legion of Honour